Sir Charles Sydney Rycroft Giffard KCMG (30 October 1926 – 21 February 2020) was a British diplomat and author. He was educated at Repton School and read classics at Wadham College, Oxford University. His career in the foreign service began in 1961. He became the British Ambassador to Switzerland from 1980. He returned to London as Deputy Under Secretary of State of the Foreign and Commonwealth Office from 1982 to 1984. From 1984 to 1986, he was Ambassador from the United Kingdom to Japan. In 1983 he received the Order of St Michael and St George and in 2003, the Order of the Rising Sun. In a statistical overview derived from writings by and about Giffard, OCLC/WorldCat encompasses roughly 8 works in 15 publications in 1 language and 1,120 library holdings.

Bibliography 

 Ai no Shogen (The Flowers are fallen) by Rinzō Shiina, 1961, translated from the Japanese by Giffard
 Japan among the powers 1880–1990, 1994 
 Guns, kites and horses: three diaries from the Western front, 2003

References 

1926 births
2020 deaths
People educated at Repton School
Alumni of Wadham College, Oxford
British Japanologists
Knights Commander of the Order of St Michael and St George
Ambassadors of the United Kingdom to Switzerland
Ambassadors of the United Kingdom to Japan
20th-century British diplomats